Bab Berred is a town in Chefchaouen Province, Tanger-Tetouan-Al Hoceima, Morocco. According to the 2004 census it has a population of 5043.

References

Populated places in Chefchaouen Province
Rural communes of Tanger-Tetouan-Al Hoceima